The Franklin County Sheriff's Residence and Jail is a historic building located in Hampton, Iowa, United States. The combination sheriff's residence and jail was the most common type of detention facility built by Iowa counties from the 1840s to around 1950. In this facility in Hampton the sheriff's residence was the two-story Italianate style structure closest to the street. There was a cell on the second floor used for female or juvenile prisoners. The sheriff's wife generally provided the meals and laundry services for the prisoners from the residence. The small cell block for men and a women's holding cell was in the single-story wing off of the back of the house. The building was constructed by local attorney D.W. Dow, and P.J. Pauly & Bro. of St. Louis provided the cells. It was completed in 1880. The sheriff continued to reside here into the 1960s, and the building was used for a jail until 1988. It was individually listed on the National Register of Historic Places in 1996. In 2003 it was included as a contributing property in the Hampton Double Square Historic District.

The building is sometimes used for filming non-pornographic videos and stories that deal with restraints and jail themes.

Houses completed in 1880
Hampton, Iowa
Houses in Franklin County, Iowa
National Register of Historic Places in Franklin County, Iowa
Houses on the National Register of Historic Places in Iowa
Jails on the National Register of Historic Places in Iowa
Italianate architecture in Iowa
Jails in Iowa
Individually listed contributing properties to historic districts on the National Register in Iowa